Kelner is a surname. Notable people with the surname include:

 Martin Kelner, British journalist, author, comedian, singer, actor, and TV presenter
 Simon Kelner (born 1957), British journalist and newspaper editor
 Toni Kelner, American author

See also
 Kellner
 Kneller
 Kilner

Jewish surnames